The 1970 Canadian Grand Prix was a Formula One motor race held at Circuit Mont-Tremblant on September 20, 1970. It was race 11 of 13 in both the 1970 World Championship of Drivers and the 1970 International Cup for Formula One Manufacturers. The 90-lap race was won by Ferrari driver Jacky Ickx after he started from second position. His teammate Clay Regazzoni finished second and March driver Chris Amon came in third. This race marked the debut of Tyrrell Racing as a constructor. Stewart took pole position for the race in the first outing for the team. Tim Schenken finishing the race only 11 laps behind is the best a De Tomaso built car ever achieved.

Qualifying

Qualifying classification

Race

Classification

Championship standings after the race

Drivers' Championship standings

Constructors' Championship standings

Note: Only the top five positions are included for both sets of standings.

References

Further reading

Canadian Grand Prix
Canadian Grand Prix
Grand Prix
Grand Prix